This is a list of American films released in 1927.

1927 Academy Award nominees 
The 1st Academy Awards were presented in Los Angeles on May 16, 1929 at The Hollywood Roosevelt Hotel. The ceremonies were hosted by Douglas Fairbanks. 1927 films released between July 1 and December 31 were eligible for the initial awards.

Wings, released in August 1927, won the Academy Award for Best Picture and Sunrise: A Song of Two Humans, released in September 1927, won in the other Best Picture category (presented only once) — Unique and Artistic Production. There were two other nominees for Best Picture — 7th Heaven, initially released in May 1927, before the eligibility period, but subsequently re-released in September — and 1928's The Racket. The other two nominees for Unique and Artistic Production were: Chang: A Drama of the Wilderness (released in April 1927, also before the eligibility period, but still in general distribution after July 1) and 1928's The Crowd.
 5 nominations [3 wins]: 7th Heaven (Outstanding Picture, Best Director—Dramatic Picture [win], Best Actress [win], Best Writing—Adapted Story [win], Best Art Direction)
 4 nominations [3 wins]: Sunrise: A Song of Two Humans (Unique and Artistic Production [win], Best Actress [win], Best Cinematography [win], Best Art Direction)
 2 nominations [2 wins]: Wings (Outstanding Picture [win], Best Engineering Effects [win])
 1 nomination plus 1 Honorary Award: The Jazz Singer (Best Writing—Adapted Story, Honorary Award for pioneer outstanding talking picture)
 1 nomination [1 win]: The Dove (Best Art Direction [win])
 1 nomination [1 win]: Two Arabian Knights (Best Director—Comedy Picture [win])
 1 nomination [1 win]: The Way of All Flesh (Best Actor [win])
 1 nomination: Sorrell and Son (Best Director)
 1 nomination: The Patent Leather Kid (Best Actor)
 1 nomination: Underworld (Best Writing—Original Story)
 1 nomination: The Devil Dancer (Best Cinematography)
 1 nomination: The Magic Flame (Best Cinematography)
 1 nomination: Chang: A Drama of the Wilderness (Unique and Artistic Production)
 1 nomination: The Private Life of Helen of Troy (Best Writing—Title Writing)

A

B

C

D

E

F

G

H

I

J

K

L

M

N

O

P

Q

R

S

T

U

V

W

Y

Shorts

See also 
 1927 in American television
 1927 in the United States

References

External links 

 1927 films at the Internet Movie Database

1927
Film
Lists of 1927 films by country or language
1920s in American cinema